The 1999–2000 season was Ulster Rugby's fifth season under professionalism, and Harry Williams's second season as head coach. They competed in the Heineken Cup and the IRFU Interprovincial Championship.

Ahead of the new season, Williams signed Paddy Johns, Simon Best, Niall Malone, Tyrone Howe, Spencer Bromley and Riaz Fredericks to full-time contracts. Mark McCall retired as a player, and was appointed assistant coach.

In the Heineken Cup, Ulster finished bottom of their pool. They came second in the Interprovincial Championship, qualifying for next season's Heineken Cup. Tony McWhirter was Ulster's Player of the Year.

Plans for a Celtic League, featuring the Irish provinces alongside teams from Scotland and Wales, were mooted. This would give the provinces a 12-game league schedule, alongside six Interpros and at east six Heineken Cup matches, and mean contracted players would no longer be available for their All-Ireland League clubs, but play exclusively for their provinces. This plan would not materialise for another few seasons.

Player transfers

Players in
  Simon Best from Newcastle
  Spencer Bromley from Harlequins
  Riaz Fredericks
  Tyrone Howe
  Paddy Johns from Saracens
  Niall Malone from Worcester
  Dion O'Cuinneagain from Sale
  Joeli Veitayaki

Players out
  Mark McCall (retired)
  Stanley McDowell (out of contract)
  Andy Park (out of contract)
  Michael Patton (out of contract)

Squad

1999–2000 Heineken Cup

Pool 3

1999–2000 IRFU Interprovincial Championship

Top three teams qualify for next season's Heineken Cup.

Friendlies

Ulster Rugby Awards
The Ulster Rugby Awards ceremony was held on 18 May 2000 at the La Mon House Hotel. Winners were:

Bank of Ireland Ulster player of the year: Tony McWhirter
Guinness personality of the year: David Humphreys
Reneault schools player of the year: Matt McCullough
Calor Gas youth player of the year: Martin Miller, Coleraine
First Trust club of the year: Ballymena R.F.C.
Coach of the year: Mark McCall, Ballynahinch RFC
Dorrie B. Faulkner Award: Jack Lewis, Civil Service Rugby Club

References

1999-2000
1999–2000 in Irish rugby union
1999–2000 Heineken Cup